Marsh Lake is a part of the Yukon River in Yukon, Canada.

Marsh Lake or Lake Marsh may refer to:

Lakes

Canada
Marsh Lake (Lunenburg), a lake in the Municipal District of Lunenburg, Nova Scotia
Marsh Lake (Nova Scotia), a lake of Halifax Regional Municipality, Nova Scotia

United States
 Marsh Lake in Desha County, Arkansas
Marsh Lake, a lake in Carver County, Minnesota
 Marsh Lake (Hennepin) in Bloomington, Minnesota
Marsh Lake, Laketown Township, Minnesota
Lake Marsh (South Dakota)

Other uses
Marsh Lake, Yukon, an unincorporated community in Canada